Two on the Tiles is a 1951 British comedy film directed by John Guillermin and starring Herbert Lom, Hugh McDermott and Brenda Bruce. It was made at the Walton Studios by the independent Vandyke Productions for release as a second feature. It was one of three back-to-back productions Guillermin directed for the company at Walton Studios, along with Smart Alec and Four Days,. It was released in the U.S. as School for Brides.

Synopsis
A married couple both face temptations while separated for a few days. The husband meets an attractive female fellow traveler in Paris while the wife accidentally spends a night aboard a Royal Navy ship with a male friend after she is stranded following a party. Despite knowing the essential innocence of both husband and wife, their sinister new butler uses information about their discretions to demand blackmail payments.

Cast

Production
Like Smart Alec is based on a script by Alec Coppel.

Critical reception
TV Guide  gave the film two out of five stars, calling it an "innocuous comedy," but also finding it "enjoyable."

References

External links

Two on the Tiles at Reel Streets
Two on the Tiles at Letterbox DVD
Two on the Tile at park Circus
Review of film at Variety

Bibliography
 Chibnall, Steve & McFarlane, Brian. The British 'B' Film. Palgrave MacMillan, 2009.

1951 films
British comedy films
Films directed by John Guillermin
1951 comedy films
Films set in Paris
Films set in London
Films shot at Nettlefold Studios
British black-and-white films
1950s English-language films
1950s British films